Grandmaster of Demonic Cultivation (or MDZS) is a danmei novel written by Chinese author Mo Xiang Tong Xiu, also known as MXTX. The story is set in a fictional xianxia world where humans known as "cultivators" specialize in spiritual, physical, and paranormal pursuits to achieve transcendence from mortality. It tells the tale of the eponymous Wei Wuxian, who diverged from conventional practices and invented an unorthodox path of cultivation.

Grandmaster of Demonic Cultivation follows several interwoven stories: two parallel tales recounting the events of Wei Wuxian's past and present lives, the investigation of the mystery behind a fierce dismembered entity presently terrorizing the cultivation world, and the development of the novel's central love story between Wei Wuxian and Lan Wangji, his former classmate and fellow cultivator.

Within the world of Grandmaster of Demonic Cultivation, issues concerning loyalty, classism, power and corruption, perception vs. reality, and ethics of violence frequently come about. The story is littered with true magical elements and supernatural beings, but the focus is on human characters in grounded conflicts.

The novel originated as a serialized fiction on the Chinese online platform Jinjiang Literature City from 2015 to 2016. , it has been officially translated into 11 different languages. The first two volumes of the ongoing official English translation reached The New York Times Best Seller list upon their release.

Among its official multimedia adaptations are a webcomic, an audio drama, an animated series and its spin-off, an audiobook, a live action web series, and an upcoming mobile game.

Grandmaster of Demonic Cultivation is noted for the vast popularity and proliferation of its same-sex romantic couple Wangxian, and for its intensely devoted fan community both within China and abroad.

Synopsis 
Grandmaster of Demonic Cultivation is the story of the rise, death, and rebirth of Wei Wuxian (魏无羡), a man who made a name for himself as a cultivator with unconventional and forbidden methods to control the undead. Renowned as the founder of the ‘Demonic Path,’ he is eventually killed during an attack by the Four Great Clans.

Thirteen years later, Wei Wuxian's spirit is forcefully summoned during a self-sacrificial ritual and he incarnates into the body of a man named Mo Xuanyu (莫玄羽). Wei Wuxian soon becomes embroiled in an investigation of a series of attacks by a feral dismembered corpse. With a new and unrecognizable face, he attempts to hide his return from the familiar faces he reunites with along his journey. But the stoic Lan Wangji (蓝忘机) of the Gusu Lan Clan may suspect more than he lets on, and Wei Wuxian may have to face the truth of his resurrection in a world changed by his thirteen-year absence, along with his true feelings for Lan Wangji.

Story overview

Setting 
Set in a fictional xianxia world reminiscent of ancient China, where human civilization consists of ordinary commoners and people who belong in the cultivation world, around which the story revolves. Cultivators train and work to accomplish superhuman feats in their attempt to reach transcendence from the mortal realm. Those with sufficient control over their spiritual energy undertake fantastical tasks such as liberating spirits, fighting malevolent ghosts and fierce corpses, exorcising haunted places or objects, and hunting down yaoguai and powerful lawless individuals. Their powers may be channeled through spiritual weapons, musical instruments, arrays, talismans, alchemy, and various other forms of cultivation tools.

The Golden Core (金丹, Jīn Dān) is a cultivated orb materialized from concentrated Qi—fundamental energy that constitutes overall health—within the body of a living person and functions as storage for their spiritual power. Once formed, the golden core may escalate the user's cultivation level, resulting in faster skill development and increased longevity. It is a crucial aspect of being a cultivator, as there are certain feats, techniques, and defensive methods that can only be performed with the help of a well-developed golden core. Core formation and development can be achieved through years of diligent routine practices such as meditation and general martial arts training. A person's golden core is impossible to restore if destroyed or removed. Humans who do not possess one, or those who form it late in life, never develop a strong cultivation base and must rely on tools, techniques, or other 'paths' that do not require extensive use of their own spiritual energy.

The cultivation world is made up of numerous clans big and small. In the recent past, the most prominent of these were the Five Great Clans: Qishan Wen Clan (岐山温氏; Qíshān Wēn Shì), Yunmeng Jiang Clan (云梦江氏; Yúnmèng Jiāng Shì), Gusu Lan Clan (姑苏蓝氏; Gūsū Lán Shì), Lanling Jin Clan (兰陵金氏; Lánlíng Jīn Shì), and Qinghe Nie Clan (清河聂氏; Qīnghé Niè Shì). Each clan is situated at their respective region wherein disciples are trained in their specific clan-oriented 'cultivation path,' which they use in practice to protect citizens under their jurisdiction from physical and paranormal threats, to gain glory for their clan, and to improve their personal cultivation level. These pursuits are called Night Hunts, due to mostly being carried out at night as it is the likeliest time of day that supernatural creatures come about.

Aside from their capacity to perform superhuman feats, most cultivators are presented as gentry scholars who train and may become proficient in the Chinese Six Arts, which places them at the top of the social hierarchy. Meanwhile, there are also those who exist as "rogue cultivators," ones who do not belong in any clan, sect, or organization due to them abandoning it, never being in one, being expelled, or their clan/sect being destroyed.

Plot summary 
(The novel has a non-linear narrative structure with several intertwining plots. Below is a per storyline summary of events.)

The principal storyline begins thirteen years after the death of Wei Wuxian, the Yiling Patriarch (夷陵老祖; Yílíng Lǎozǔ), as he is summoned back to life by Mo Xuanyu through a self-sacrificial ritual. Wei Wuxian is reborn and awakens in the body of a homosexual lunatic, while fully cognizant of his own identity. He finds himself in Mo Village, where he is to fulfill the ritual's condition—to take revenge on Mo Xuanyu's behalf and exterminate the Mo family for abusing him—or else Wei Wuxian's own soul will be forever annihilated. He is freed from this condition when a vicious entity appears and goes on a murder spree that kills every one of Mo Xuanyu's abusers. While exploring the new world he finds himself in, he stumbles into people from his past and ends up accompanying Lan Wangji, his former classmate and a highly esteemed cultivator. The two become embroiled in the mystery of the evil entity, which left in its path a series of clues all seemingly leading back to Wei Wuxian's past. As they travel to unravel the case, Wei Wuxian re-lives previously encountered struggles and trials, and attempts to deal with the hatred of the cultivation world once more, along with the changes in his relationship with Lan Wangji.

While the main narrative covers the present timeline, it is intermingled with intermittent flashbacks recounting Wei Wuxian's previous life, from his glory days as a promising young cultivator until his death as the reviled Yiling Patriarch. As the 15-year-old senior disciple of the Yunmeng Jiang Clan, Wei Wuxian was a highly charismatic, willful, intelligent young man possessing a strong cultivation base and exceptional skills. He had a close relationship with his clan siblings, Jiang Yanli (江厌离) and Jiang Cheng (江澄). While in Cloud Recesses, he met the stern and aloof Lan Wangji, one of the Twin Jades of the Gusu Lan Clan. The two would maintain an ambiguous relationship throughout their years of acquaintance prior to Wei Wuxian's death.

At a crucial point in the story, Wei Wuxian invented the Ghost Path (鬼道, guǐ dào) of cultivation which, unlike other paths, functions by harvesting and manipulating the resentful energy emitted by fierce ghosts and corpses. With this use of unorthodox methods to overthrow the tyrannical Qishan Wen Clan during the Sunshot Campaign, the cultivation world hailed Wei Wuxian as a war hero for his significant efforts and contributions that led to their victory. However, the fickle nature of society soon reared its head as the clans began to perceive him as a dangerous threat—someone willful and powerful enough to break out from the confines of society's rules, or someone who suffered from moral decay due to walking down the crooked path—while they coveted his powerful inventions all the same. Tensions escalated as Wei Wuxian kept up his objections to the Lanling Jin Clan's inhumane treatment of prisoners of war. Trapped between incompatible duties, he took it upon himself to rescue the Wen refugees and become their sole protector at the Burial Mounds in Yiling, willingly taking on people's anger and distrust with unshakeable conviction. He thus gained the title of Yiling Patriarch and was vilified as a traitor to the Jiangs and declared an "enemy of the cultivation world." Rumors and conspiracies arose, leading to more deaths and devastation, and with the fallout of morals and priorities colliding, it all came to a head at the First Siege of the Burial Mounds by the Four Great Clans, during which Wei Wuxian and the people he was protecting met their inglorious and bloody demise, and the world rejoiced.

The overarching story is a romantic arc that deals with the development of the novel's central love story between Wei Wuxian and Lan Wangji. Focalized through Wei Wuxian's limited point of view, it tells of their carefree, flirtatious days as teens—with the irreverent, mischievous Wei Wuxian juxtaposed against the somber, stickler-for-rules Lan Wangji; of the tentative bond they developed as young adults navigating the contentious issue of Wei Wuxian's cultivation path and the conflicts and struggles they're confronted with; and of their reunion thirteen years later when their dynamic swiftly turns into an emotionally intense mixture of extreme dedication, and overwhelming mutual romantic and sexual desire. It is eventually revealed that Lan Wangji had been secretly yearning for Wei Wuxian the whole time they'd known each other, and that his love and devotion never faltered in all the years the latter had been dead. The Wangxian (忘羡) storyline tells of the deep, valid connection between two men who see past surface distractions to recognize the similarities in the way they live their lives, the values they uphold, their sense of purpose, strength, and self-worth, and of the rich potential for profound happiness that may result from such. As well, it notably displays the power of sexual chemistry and compatibility reinforced by romantic love, freely given and openly acknowledged between an unexpected couple.

Publication history

Overview 

The first chapter was released on the Chinese web novel platform Jinjiang Literature City (晋江文学城) on October 31, 2015, and serialization continued until the main story's completion on March 1, 2016. The next several months were spent revising the main chapters, while side stories (or "extra chapters") were released sporadically. Revision of the main story was posted on August 11, 2016, and the last four extra chapters were added between December 22, 2017, and January 1, 2018. Overall, the novel's online version had a total of 113 main chapters and seven extra chapters, most of which occur after the story's main events (also known as "post-canon").

The Taiwan first print edition was published by Pinsin Studio (平心工作室) in December 2016 in Traditional Chinese. It consists of four volumes containing the uncensored main story and four extra chapters, one of which is an exclusive extra (From Dawn to Dusk) that was never published on the Jinjiang site.

In December 2018, Sichuan Literature and Art Publishing House (四川文艺出版社) published the first volume, titled "无羁" in Simplified Chinese. It contains chapters 1-42 and the extra chapter Lotus Seed Pod, as well as a commemorative letter written by Mo Xiang Tong Xiu on October 31, 2018, the third anniversary of the web novel's original serialization. Subsequent volumes are stalled due to the novel being censured and eventually locked on the Jinjiang platform in January 2019.

In August 2019, Pinsin Studio released a four-volume Collector Edition, featuring new cover art for each volume illustrated by Qian Er Bai (千二百). The actual text and story contents are identical to the 2016 version. A special Side Stories Edition book was released in February 2020. It contains the last four extra chapters that were added on the Jinjiang site in 2017–2018.

Translations

Fan translations 
Before licenses had been secured for the official release of foreign editions, fan-made translations of the novel had been instrumental in spreading Grandmaster of Demonic Cultivation’s fame internationally. Various groups had been formed by avid fans to provide valuable, free translations into several different languages, to be shared widely online. Each group had later willingly taken down these translation projects, as foreign publishers acquired the licenses for the novel's commercial release in their respective countries.

Official translations 
, Grandmaster of Demonic Cultivation has been officially translated into Vietnamese, Thai, Korean, Burmese, Hungarian, Russian, Japanese, German, English, Brazilian Portuguese, and French. An Italian and Spanish versions have also been announced for 2023 release.

Official novel releases 

Below is a table guide featuring the novel's official translations and editions so far:

Concept and creation

Background and influences 
Mo Xiang Tong Xiu (hereafter referred to as MXTX) did not like writing as a child, though she was a voracious reader and loved making up stories. Due to this, she initially aspired to become a mangaka. While in middle school, she developed a strong interest in danmei after reading a fanfiction about the anime D.Gray-man, wherein the male main character fell in love with a male side character. In time, she decided to reevaluate her goals and start concentrating on writing.

MXTX grew up under the cultural influences of Hong Kong movies and Japanese animation. She credits Jin Yong as her all-time favorite author and one of her greatest literary influences; “Mr. Jin Yong will always be my favorite writer. It is my luck to be able to read his works in this life and to be in the same era as this master. I hope to read his books in the next life.”  She considers Arthur Conan Doyle and Soji Shimada as her favorite mystery and crime fiction writers. She has also acknowledged Agatha Christie, whose magnum opus she read and enjoyed.

Her favorite genres are Wuxia, Mystery, and Supernatural. As she considers real life to be boring, she is partial to stories with surreal elements and feels detached from stories with pure realistic themes.

Inspiration 
For half a year after the completion of her first web novel The Scum Villain's Self-Saving System in November 2014, MXTX had been mulling over ideas for Grandmaster of Demonic Cultivation. She conceived the story during her last year of university while out on a night stroll, listening to music to take her mind off her graduation thesis. Her imagination wandered off to a blurry scene of "a forest surrounded by rain and darkness, a man clad in black with pale complexion and blood on his face, snapping in half something in his hand, his expression cold. It was either a flute or an arrow."

Her growing interest in a potential backdrop for this scene led her to ponder "what kind of journey [this character] would have been through." In pursuit of this, she started with the emotion, then character, and at last a story.

MXTX began writing the novel after graduation. She described the work as a self-indulgent passion project, intended as creative writing practice in tackling a greater number of characters with more complex relationships, alongside experimenting with varying narrative devices, risky storytelling techniques, and deconstruction of xianxia genre conventions.

Worldbuilding 
Ancient China has been the traditional background setting for xianxia stories. Grandmaster of Demonic Cultivation’s conventions were taken from the Wei (魏朝), Jin (晉朝), Northern and Southern Dynasties (南北朝), and the Tang Dynasty (唐朝). Yet as the tale is set in an imaginary world, there is no strict adherence to the norms of any one single dynasty or time period. The author spoke of creating a mishmash of all the ancient China elements she liked and tailoring them into a workable fictional setting, subduing historical accuracy in favor of characters and storytelling.

MXTX kept a separate file for basic information regarding each clan, which include their emblem, home base location, sphere of influence, clan rules, and motto. She recalled drawing on a map of China and assigning real locations as the modern-day counterpart bases for the major clan regions featured in the story. Among these are Suzhou City (苏州市) in Jiangsu Province (江苏省) as Gusu; Wuhan City (武汉市) in Hubei Province (湖北省) as Yunmeng; Lanling County (兰陵县) in Shandong Province (山东省) as Lanling; Qishan County (岐山县) in Shaanxi Province (陕西省) as Qishan; and Qinghe County (清河县) in Hebei Province (河北省) as Qinghe.

The world of Grandmaster of Demonic Cultivation is primarily populated by humans, although supernatural entities abound. Among these are: yao (妖, yāo) formed from living non-humans; demons (魔, mó) formed from living humans; ghosts (鬼, guǐ) formed from dead humans; and monsters (怪, guài) formed from dead non-humans. In addition to ordinary animals, there exist powerful creatures such as the Measuring Snake (量人蛇, Liángrén Shé), the legendary Qiongqi (穷奇道) beast, and the sentient statue goddess Heavenly Maiden. Spiritual dogs, rabbits, turtles, pigs, and other down-to-earth fauna originate from cultivators raising and training them as magical guardians, and they grow to exhibit far more intelligence and endurance than those possessed by common animals. Mythical beings resembling the Four Beast Guardians: Black Tortoise (Xuánwǔ) of the North, Azure Dragon (Qīnglóng) of the East, Vermilion Bird (Zhūquè) of the South, and White Tiger (Báihǔ) of the West, also appear or are mentioned, though they have more inauspicious associations (Slaughter, Bloodlust, Carnage, and Brutality, respectively) compared to their traditional roles in Chinese mythology.

Within the low fantasy xianxia setting of Grandmaster of Demonic Cultivation, a state of "true immortality" for living humans does not exist. There is no higher level than the perfect utilization of the golden core. Humans who cultivate and develop their golden core to its maximum potential can live up to 500 years, compared to characters featured in high fantasy xianxia stories such as mythical beings, demons, and humans who ascend to godhood and can exist for millennia.

Unlike many xianxia novels where the cultivation world is run by sects (门派, ménpài) with a strict master and disciple relationship and a person of any family background can take on the mantle of leadership based on exceptional talent and good moral character, Grandmaster of Demonic Cultivation has its cultivation world led mostly by clans (世家, shìjiā), which are bound by blood ties. This bloodline limitation for inheriting leadership may result in the stagnation of a clan, as the designated heir may not necessarily be the most talented or virtuous individual within the organization.

An emperor and his imperial court exist in the periphery of the world, but MXTX decided to downplay their significance in order to focus on the insular society of cultivators and the conflicts that occur within.

Character construction 
At the time MXTX consciously planned out her characters, she had written over a thousand word descriptions for each of the main leads, Wei Wuxian and Lan Wangji. Between the two, Wei Wuxian was the first to be conceived. MXTX recalled having a difficult time deciding on the type of love interest perfectly suited for him. The process proved to be complicated as she experimented on various iterations of the character through mixing and matching different personality traits, appearance, age, origin, and backstory, then testing their potential chemistry with Wei Wuxian.

Ultimately, she came into an epiphany, "It's him!" and chose Lan Wangji—the first version of the character and the one she had in mind all along—and this return to her initial plan proved more rewarding as she realized that Wei Wuxian and Lan Wangji were always meant to be together, both in-story and in the stage of conception; “So, Lan Wangji and Wei Wuxian's intertwined fates were preordained. They have both the predestined affinity and the predestined entanglement. If it's him, it'll always be him.”

MXTX also had the following to say about them: “All of [Wei Wuxian's and Lan Wangji's] character elements were created in binary opposition. The bold and the principled; the concealed yearning and the flaunting coquetry; the red rose and the white rose; the cold, dignified one, and the devilish untamed one…although they are opposites in many ways, their core was the same. To put it plainly, they share the same Three Outlooks [on life, the world, and morality].”"[Lan Wangji] has his own way of viewing right and wrong. [...] He believes and supports these ideals not just because he likes Wei Ying, but because what he is doing is correct in his eyes. [...] Lan Zhan had always been looking at him, wondering and understanding that essence, and was deeply attracted to that."

Xiao Xingchen and Xue Yang were originally conceived while MXTX was in high school. During self-study sessions, she spent her time jotting things down on her notebook, and that was when she settled on their names and personalities. She hadn't yet had a full plot or actual context for their story, but had come up with a few fragments of interactions which she later put directly into the novel's Yi City arc. Writing about Xue Yang required adjusting her mental space into the darkest, cruelest state, while the exact opposite was required for Xiao Xingchen; "Switching between the angel and the devil brought quite some satisfaction."

MXTX intended for Wen Ning to die permanently in the present timeline. She originally planned to turn him into ashes on the boat leaving Lotus Pier. However, MXTX changed her mind as she realized that there was not enough foreshadowing, and she didn't want to abruptly kill off Wen Ning for shock or cheap angst. A similar thing happened with Jin Ling, whom MXTX also planned to kill off and turn into a fierce corpse in order to defeat the big villain at the end of the story. She turned around from this idea since Jin Ling no longer needed to replace Wen Ning.

Nie Huaisang was originally planned to have a partner-in-crime that MXTX eventually scrapped after realizing that the character might hurt the structure of the story. She later found that the novel still felt complete without said character. Additionally, she has shared that Nie Huiasang is the intended next Chief Cultivator at the end of the story.

MXTX expressed befuddlement at readers’ impression of Lan Xichen as someone who is a "calculating, farsighted person deep inside.” She claimed that she had never given him any traits that would make readers interpret him in such a way, adding “to be a clan leader didn't require deep insight and acute perception,” reflecting one of the novel's themes surrounding class-based societies.

Wei Wuxian, Lan Wangji, Jiang Cheng, and Jin Guangyao generate the most feedback from readers. MXTX has stated, “both Wei Wuxian and Lan Wangji are highly ideal characters, so there wouldn't be much dispute about their moral standing. They're perfect as the protagonists,” and “I hope each of you who enjoys this book can be like Lan Wangji in virtue and Wei Wuxian in character.”She saw Jiang Cheng as someone with “many personality flaws, but not an intrinsically bad person.” She explained that she was quite objective in writing him as she saw him as just one of the many characters she has created, and she understood readers being either vocally supportive of him, or wanting to hate him. On Jin Guangyao: “The Jin Guangyao in my eyes, is a scum who is ruthless enough to use all available measures to climb up the political ladder, but there's also a tiny bit of human decency remaining inside him.”

Writing process 
In the beginning, the writing process was easy and relaxed—an excellent condition for creativity. As pressure from reality and demand for frequent updates increased, time and energy required for more polished chapters began lacking. Drafts became intermittent, and MXTX had to come up with raw updates the rest of the time. She kept an outline with almost ten thousand words, making it possible to keep up with daily updates, but they were not always detailed enough and she still felt constrained many times. She had to write with quite a lot of choppiness and caution, and had to rush parts she otherwise wanted to expand upon. There were many problems with details and logic she didn't have the time to modify. She also had a habit of deleting parts of the outline as she went along, like checking off tasks from a to-do list, as it gave her a refreshing sense of satisfaction.

Initially setting out to write a story about “cold-blooded revenge and triumphing over the scum,” MXTX sensed that the tone grew increasingly somber along the way, due to her affinity towards scar-filled characters with stories to tell and her admiration for the emotional resilience and fortitude they possess. The tale thus gradually became less about pure revenge and more about the exploration of internal conflicts borne by “scarred” characters, as well as complicated gratitude and relationships.

MXTX felt that coming up with scenes showing either chemistry or conflict (also known as “flirting or fighting”) were “beyond wonderful experiences.” She especially enjoyed writing every scene between Wei Wuxian and Lan Wangji during their younger days in Gusu, as well as ones depicting tension and high conflict involving many others, such as Yu Ziyuan, Wang Lingjiao, Jiang Cheng, and the Yi City characters. She declared that “all these were the biggest joys [Mo Dao Zu Shi] has brought me. They were joys no other thing could ever compare to.”

For the ending, MXTX originally wanted to part with a line from a poem which goes thus: 
“the melody ceases and none is to be seen; 
the river streams beneath columns of mountain green.” 

In the end, while she felt that the poem was beautiful and meaningful, the tone was too lonely and melancholic and didn't capture the type of ending she was going for. Instead she came up with: 
“on and on the Wangxian melody drifts; 
the song ceases yet the figures persist.” 

During writing, MXTX gets emotionally involved in her novels' main romantic pairings. This led to her frequent reminders and reassurances to readers that Wangxian will always be an exclusive and unbreakable couple, as she requested a similar display of consideration from her fans to respect the canonical integrity of her novel's central romance. In relation to this, she has stated that she no longer liked writing secondary couples or “side ships” since it consumes a huge amount of energy to write emotional danmei stories, and she would rather focus all of her attention on the development of her main couples’ romance.

MXTX asserted that except for the main couple, she did not like labeling every other character in her novels as homosexual, since "oftentimes, labeling and locking down things can take away the beauty and possibilities of  [relationships between male characters]." Designing motivations for conflicts not based solely on love or attraction gives more room for interpretation and logical analysis. However, she was quick to clarify her stance that readers and fan creators can choose to interpret her characters and their relationships however they prefer, as long as the main couple stays intact, with respect to their canonical romantic and sexual dynamics.

The old version of the novel had 520K words in its main story, and the revised version came up to have 570K words. MXTX had acknowledged that during the original run, there might have been too many “immature sections,” since due to the nature of serialization, it was difficult to edit to satisfaction once the framework had already been set in stone. After some reflection, she considered it as “another footprint of [her] growth.”

MXTX deemed the whole revision process a huge undertaking but one that granted her much contentment, having had more time and energy to edit scenes, enrich details, add crucial plot elements, and change places that didn't make logical sense. Among the scenes she originally skipped during serialization and added back in during revisions are: the blindfold kiss between Lan Wangji and Wei Wuxian at Phoenix Mountain, due to MXTX not having enough energy during the initial run to think through how such a large-scale hunting competition would work; the path of how Nie Mingjue and Jin Guangyao turned from friends to enemies; the blood pool corpse battle at the Burial Mounds, because MXTX didn't have the patience to write fighting scenes; and Lan Sizhui realizing his true identity and background, because MXTX simply forgot.

In the end, she declared that the final revised version is “in [her] heart closer to the story's original form.” In response to readers who might have formed attachments and deep-rooted impressions from the old version and might feel doubt and dissatisfaction for the revised version, she had this to say:
“I know there are many things that can't satisfy everyone, so I chose to satisfy myself. When I look back at this story, at least I’ve written everything I wanted to write, and there wouldn't be too many regrets.”

Narrative structure, style, and techniques 
Grandmaster of Demonic Cultivation adopts a non-linear structure with a back-and-forth timeline, enabled by intermingling narratives through extensive utilization of flashbacks. Past events are presented via straightforward narrative recall, dream immersions, anecdotes, revelational moments, and use of an in-story framing device called ‘Empathy,’ a special technique which allows the user to see through dead people's memories.

The novel is predominantly written from a third person limited point of view, with a large part of the narrative framed through Wei Wuxian's eyes. The novel veers off to other characters' points of view on occasion. These characters may clarify or provide different perspectives on past and present events. The text often withholds information from both the readers and the focal character, though occasionally, it may deviate from this and show readers information withheld from the character. Stream of consciousness mode is often used when Wei Wuxian is struggling to make sense of his emotions, or when he is hyper focused while solving a mystery.

Events planned from the beginning are foreshadowed, though careful consideration is taken so as to not make the mystery aspects easily solvable nor the overall story too predictable. There is rampant use of symbolism throughout, their significance notable both in-universe and on a meta level. Plot twists are deployed at several points in the story, dramatically affecting character impressions and relationship dynamics.

Characterization by style

MXTX makes use of varied linguistic registers for certain individual characters, their speaking style adapted to their personality and standing, and suited to their interactions with specific characters.

In Grandmaster of Demonic Cultivation, MXTX's most distinct and notable stylistic "voice" is that of Lan Wangji's, with his economical yet effective usage of words. He has an impressively elegant and scholarly speech pattern, specifically following "言简意赅" (concise and comprehensive), a classical written way of structuring sentences into four characters. With this he is able to concisely articulate his thoughts, with sharp intent and no excessive words, fully embodying his mastery of the language as well as his taciturn nature.

Adaptations

Web comic 
A web comic (manhua) adaptation of the same name (official English title: The Master of Diabolism), was officially distributed online by kuaikanmanhua (快看漫画) from December 8, 2017 until October 26, 2022, finishing with 259 chapters. It was co-created by Kuangfeng Chui Kudang (狂风吹裤裆) as the scriptwriter and Luo Di Cheng Qiu (落地成球) as the main illustrator. Luo Di Cheng Qiu is also known by the general fandom by their other pen name Mao Tuan Xiao Jian Jian (毛团小剑剑). The cover art for Volume 1 was illustrated by HAloggz.

In 2019, the manhua won the silver award for Most Popular Web Comic Adaptation at the 16th China Animation Golden Dragon Award, and the Best Manhua award at the China Golden Rooster and Hundred Flowers Film Festival (1st Network Drama Awards).

The first volume of the Mainland Simplified physical print version, titled “赤笛云琴记” (English title: Memoirs of the Red Flute and the Heavenly Guqin) was published by China Radio and Television Press (中国广播影视出版社) in August 2020.

Taiwan's Pinsin Studio handles the currently ongoing publication of the Traditional uncensored print version, using its original title (“魔道祖師”; Mó Dào Zǔ Shī), starting with the release of Volume 1 in September 2021.

An official online English translation was available at WeComics website from October 18, 2019, to September 14, 2021. It ran up to chapter 197 before being discontinued. On November 19, 2021, all the chapters were removed due to WeComics finalizing its migration as Webnovel, which does not hold licenses for several manhua titles, including The Master of Diabolism. Seven Seas Entertainment has since acquired the rights to the official English physical print version, with Volume 1 set to be released in March 2023.

The manhua's official online Korean translation was released from March 18, 2020 up to December 21, 2022. All the chapters are available on Lezhin Comics official website. 
 
Below is a table guide featuring the manhua's officially published printed editions so far:

Audio drama 
Mo Dao Zu Shi official audio drama was produced by Polar Penguin Studios (北斗企鹅工作室 制作) in collaboration with Sound Studio (寻声工作室), and supervised by the original novel's author Mo Xiang Tong Xiu. It encompasses three seasons and is broadcast on the Chinese audio streaming app MaoEr FM (猫耳FM). It features voice actors Lu Zhixing (路知行) as Wei Wuxian and Wei Chao (魏超) as Lan Wangji.

The first season aired from June 8 to August 24, 2018, with a total of 12 episodes along with some extras. The second season aired from October 5, 2018, to April 5, 2019, with a total of 16 episodes along with some extras. The theme song for Season 1 up to mid Season 2 is "何以歌", performed by Aki (阿杰). Starting from Season 2 Episode 11, the theme song changed to "忘羡". This is a duet between Lan Wangji and Wei Wuxian, and is performed by Wu En (吾恩) and Yu Xia (余夏). The third season aired from June 17 to December 29, 2019, with a total of 17 episodes along with some extras. The theme song for Season 3 is "人间纵我", and is performed by Wu En and Yu Xia.

The audio drama features unique cover art for each episode, officially illustrated by various artists within the Mo Dao Zu Shi fandom. These include Higga, HAloggz, A-Xin (阿昕), Qian Er Bai (千二百), Changyang (长阳RIN), SpoonKid, Ma Que Su (麻雀酥), Qingshui Bai Taozi (清水白桃子), Zukiyn (坠), and mewkoala.

The audio drama was a critical and financial success, praised for its storyline, faithfulness to the source material, production value, and the voice actors' performances. It amassed hundreds of million playbacks across all three seasons, with each episode placing on top of the weekly rankings during their original run. The series has garnered over 600 million playbacks . All three seasons still remain as the website's top 3 most listened to series in the overall ranking.

Mo Dao Zu Shi’s audio drama OST boxset was released in 2020. The deluxe edition came with various merchandise, including: two official soundtrack CDs, an artbook featuring all the illustrated artworks produced for the show, a lyrics book, an autograph booklet with the staff members’ personalized notes and signatures, a music box playing the audio drama version of the Wangxian theme song, postcards, badges, and a USB flash drive containing video and audio recordings of behind-the-scenes moments and voice performers’ messages for fans.

Japanese audio drama version 
The audio drama's massive success and popularity led to it being brought over to Japan for a localized adaptation, produced by Brave Hearts and in close collaboration with the original Chinese audio drama team. Known as “魔道祖師日本語版ラジオドラマ” (lit. "Ma Dō So Shi Japanese Radio Drama"), it started airing on January 24, 2020, and is simultaneously broadcast on the Japanese audio streaming app MiMi FM and the Chinese audio streaming app MaoEr FM every Friday at 6pm Japan Standard Time (GMT +09:00). The show has broadcast up to the end of Season 2 .

The Japanese audio drama stars Tatsuhisa Suzuki as Wei Wuxian (Japanese: 魏無羨; romaji: Gi Musen) and Satoshi Hino as Lan Wangji (Japanese: 藍忘機; romaji: Ran Bouki). Similar to the Chinese version, it features art illustrated by fans-turned-official artists, which include Takikawa_v, Gearous, Minatu, Zaneri, Langlang_Ha, and Usako.

Physical CD boxsets get released every half season, containing the Japanese audio drama episodes and various special merchandise.

Audiobook 
An official Mo Dao Zu Shi audiobook was released by Ximalaya FM (喜马拉雅FM) from July to November 2019, consisting of 175 episodes with a total listening length of 47 hours and 16 minutes. Performance artist Zhang Zhen (张震), who also voices the character Jiang Fengmian in the Chinese audio drama, was specially invited to serve as the narrator.

Animation 

An animated (donghua) adaptation of the same name (official English title: The Founder of Diabolism), was produced by Tencent Penguin Pictures and B.C May Pictures, in collaboration with 729 Voice Studio. It premiered in China on Tencent Video on July 9, 2018, and concluded on October 16, 2021, with 35 episodes aired over three seasons. It features Zhang Jie as Wei Wuxian and Bian Jiang (边江) as Lan Wangji.

The donghua version of the Wangxian song, titled "羡云", was originally sung by HITA and released in 2019. A duet version sung by Zhang Jie and Bian Jiang was released after the final episode. In the actual show, Lan Wangji reveals that the song's title is "忘羡", in accordance with novel canon.

A chibi spin-off series, titled The Founder of Diabolism Q, aired from July 31, 2020 to January 29, 2021 for 30 episodes. Most episodes are a light-hearted take on the events of the series, serving as re-imaginings or as gap fillers. Each episode runs for approximately 5 minutes. Per official synopsis, “The Founder of Diabolism Q takes the three periods of Wei Wuxian's life (adolescence, adulthood, and rebirth after death) as the theme, and selects the cute, warm, and healing parts as the main content. This spin-off hopes to heal those audiences who love The Founder of Diabolism donghua, but are “injured” by the melancholic plot of the show.”

Web series 

The novel was adapted as a live action web series titled "陈情令" (official English title: 'The Untamed'), produced by Tencent Penguin Pictures and New Style Media. It stars Xiao Zhan as Wei Wuxian and Wang Yibo as Lan Wangji. It aired in China on Tencent Video from June 27 to August 20, 2019 for 50 episodes; with two episodes every Thursday and Friday, before being changed to every Monday and Wednesday (GMT +08:00) starting July 1. The theme song, sung by Xiao Zhan and Wang Yibo, was titled "忘羡" before being renamed to "无羁".

Mobile game 
An upcoming Chinese mobile game, titled The Untamed, is slated for global release in 2022 and it will be available on iOS and Android. The news was announced via Weibo on October 31, 2019The game will be a card and visual type game.

Reception

General 
During the serialization of her first web novel The Scum Villain's Self-Saving System in late 2014, MXTX slowly earned her reputation on the Jinjiang platform's danmei circles, and her following continued to grow within the year. She later revealed that upon writing Grandmaster of Demonic Cultivation, she fully expected the novel to flop. She acknowledged that her chosen narrative techniques and the overall lack of indulgent points typically found in rebirth or transmigration stories could drive readers away, especially those who expected similar elements and tropes as to those found in The Scum Villain's Self-Saving System.

Contrary to this expectation, Grandmaster of Demonic Cultivation has attracted a record readership on Jinjiang Literature City as well as for its multiple-language translated prints, and the series as a whole with its various adaptations has drawn in a devoted, active, and international fan base.

Per editor recommendation featured on the Simplified physical bookprint released in December 2018: “Mo Dao Zu Shi has reached a score of 14 billion points on Jinjiang Literature City, has been bookmarked more than 1,090,000 times and has received in total more than 440,000 reviews. During the year, it has made the sales gold list, the thousand-word gold list, reigning supreme at the top of the charts and setting a new record! On Sina Weibo, the hot topic #MoDaoZuShi was the subject of nearly 6 million discussions and 6 billion reads!”

After the August 4, 2021 announcement of her three novels' English release, #MXTX trended on Twitter in the United States and several other countries for almost the entire day. Less than 24 hours later, pre-order sales for Grandmaster of Demonic Cultivation was at #8 ranking on Amazon. On August 5, 2021, it was ranked #1 out of all Barnes & Noble Bestsellers. For the next few days, it was Frontpage Trending along with MXTX's other two novels on Amazon, Barnes & Noble, and Fullybooked websites.

Awards and recognitions 
In February 2020, Mo Dao Zu Shi (Korean: 마도조사; Ma Do Jo Sa) was awarded the 'Rising Star Award' (뉴‎ 스타상) by Ridibooks, the largest e-book service platform in South Korea. Ma Do Jo Sa was the only foreign work among the thirty novels to receive the award.

Upon the first volume's English release in December 2021, Grandmaster of Demonic Cultivation debuted at #9 on The New York Times Best Seller list for Paperback Trade Fiction. The second volume was released on May 17, 2022, and was announced to have hit the #8 ranking on May 25, 2022, dated for the June 5 print of The New York Times Book Review.

In December 2021, Mo Dao Zu Shi (Japanese: 魔道祖師; Ma Dō So Shi) was awarded 1st place in the Best Novel category by “Kono BL Ga Yabai!," a BL guidebook released annually by NextFComics. On the same month, it ranked #5 in the Novel Category during ComiComi of the Year 2021, held by ComiComi Studio, an online BL shop. The awards were given to the top 5 most supported works by customers. In April 2022, it was ranked 2nd place as Best Novel during the 13th BL Award 2022, held by the Japanese BL information site “Chill Chill”.

Fandom 
Throughout much of its history, the size of Grandmaster of Demonic Cultivation'''s fan community was in the millions. Its success among the audience was built on the solid foundation of its plot and worldbuilding, the moral standards and messages it tries to promote, its themes, the complexities of its characters, and the appeal of its featured main couple 'Wangxian', based on their personality traits, relationship history, motifs surrounding their love story, and their romantic and sexual dynamics.

Further explanations for the series' early prominence were the contributions of numerous fan creators: artists such as Changyang, Higga, HAloggz, Qian Er Bai, A-Xin, STARember etc. helped build up the fandom immensely, as they provided compelling character visuals for people to latch onto before any official visual medium had been released. In addition to the above artists, others who started out as regular fans and ended up working for the various official adaptations that had been produced later are: Mao Tuan Xiao Jian Jian (manhua illustrator); Shen Lin (申琳), Xu Xiaoyuan (徐超渊), Wang Yi (蚂蚁_仙森), ENO (何何舞), saka, etc. (donghua artists); and majority of the Chinese audio drama staff members including its executive producer (括号君; Kuo Hao Jun), director (图特哈蒙; Tu Te Ha Meng), and scriptwriter (六音; Liu Yin). In a 2016 fan-made audio dramatization of a Yi City arc scene, several voice performers who would later be cast in the official adaptations played the Yi City character roles. These are: Zhang Jie (donghua Wei Wuxian) as Xue Yang, Wei Chao (audio drama Lan Wangji) as Song Lan, Tu Te Ha Meng (audio drama Nie Mingjue and voice director) as Xiao Xingchen, and Kuo Hao Jun (audio drama Meng Shi and executive producer) as A-Qing.Mo Dao Zu Shi's fan community within China is tremendous. Online platforms such as Weibo, WeChat, Lofter, Douyin, Bilibili, Zhihu, etc. have millions of active followers for topics surrounding the novel and each of its adaptations. New entries are posted almost every minute, with #MoDaoZuShi frequently on Hot Searches list. Discourses, cosplay photoshoots, fanarts, and fanfictions—one of which gained enormous popularity and became the basis for the widespread fanon about Lan Wangji's "Thirteen Years of Inquiry," also later implied to be absorbed by some adaptations like the donghua and live action drama—are abound. A significant amount of fan-made music and PVs has also been produced, some of the most notable being “问灵” which was inspired by the aforementioned fanfiction, and the 2016 "同道殊途", which took four months to complete and featured 50 participants, some of whom ended up as official staff and cast members in the donghua and audio drama adaptations.

Every year, fan-organized events are held for important dates (characters' birthdays, holidays, milestones, anniversaries, etc.) whereby fans perform various activities such as buying screentime for billboards and PVs, and releasing fan-written songs.

Outside China, Grandmaster of Demonic Cultivation has an expansive online following on platforms such as Ao3, Twitter, Tumblr, Facebook, Wattpad, Reddit, TikTok, and YouTube.Similar to the Chinese fandom, international fans engage in active discourses, interactive AUs, character shipping, and postings of new fan content on a daily basis. For the year 2020, the character pairing of Lan Wangji/Wei Wuxian was ranked #1 on fanfiction site Ao3's Top 100 list of pairings with the most newly written works.

Fans knowledgeable in Chinese language, culture, and traditions regularly embark on translation projects and educational posts that promote more insight and cultural sensitivity among foreign fans.

Russian artist and MXTX fan Marina Privalova illustrated the interior artworks for the novel's Russian and English releases.

MXTX fans Suika and Pengie work on the novel's official English release as the translator and editor, respectively. They are also the official English translation team for MXTX's third novel, Heaven Official's Blessing. Artists Jin Fang, moo, wenwen, and minatu who draw Grandmaster of Demonic Cultivation fanart, provide the novel's cover art and bonus colored interior illustrations.

Licensed merchandise from official stores under IP contract with Grandmaster of Demonic Cultivation and The Untamed are frequently on sale and regularly supported by casual fans and hardcore collectors alike, both within China and abroad.

 Legacy 
“Although its popularity exists largely outside of English-language pop culture, MDZS (as it is called) is widely popular on a scale that most stories will never approach.” - Kali Wallace, (excerpt from a review article on tor.com)Though Mo Dao Zu Shi was not the first of its kind, the novel and its adaptations have been credited as significant influential factors in the emergence of the danmei genre in international fandom spaces. The story's popularity and fan demand led to foreign publishers securing the license rights to translate and publish the novel, even in countries that have never been exposed to danmei stories. Mo Dao Zu Shi has become a “gateway,” its success leading the way for official foreign publications of more danmei novels.

The novel's animated adaptation The Founder of Diabolism, with its strong audience ratings and critical acclaim, had been considerably influential in the increased international exposure to the Chinese animation industry. Foreign viewers who were fans of Japanese anime discovered The Founder of Diabolism donghua upon its 2018 release and hailed it for its storyline and animation quality, and word-of-mouth eventually spread on myanimelist, Twitter, and tumblr websites.

The live action web series adaptation The Untamed'' has been credited as a major contributor to the increased global presence and popularity of Asian media content, especially Chinese dramas. Actors Xiao Zhan and Wang Yibo both shot to widespread attention and stardom domestically and overseas after their breakthrough roles as Wei Wuxian and Lan Wangji, respectively. They have since become two of China's most popular, in-demand, and influential celebrities.

In 2018, a star under the Scorpius constellation was named after Wei Wuxian, in time for his October 31 birthday.

Notes

Works cited

References

Primary

Secondary

External links 

Mo Xiang Tong Xiu's Page on Sina Weibo (in Chinese) 
Mo Xiang Tong Xiu's Page on Jinjiang Literature City (in Chinese) 
Grandmaster of Demonic Cultivation on Seven Seas Danmei Official Website

2016 Chinese novels
2016 LGBT-related literary works
Novels by Mo Xiang Tong Xiu
Novels set in ancient China
Novels set in fictional locations
Seven Seas Entertainment titles
Xianxia novels
Danmei novels
Chinese romance novels
Mystery novels
Wuxia novels
Chinese fantasy novels
Chinese adventure novels
Chinese erotic novels
Chinese novels adapted into television series
2010s LGBT novels